HMS Nymphe was an Amazon-class sloop, of the Royal Navy, built at the Deptford Dockyard and launched on 24 November 1866.  She served in the East Indies and Australia, and was sold in 1884.

Design
Designed by Edward Reed, the Royal Navy Director of Naval Construction, the hull was built of oak, with teak planking and fir decks, and she was equipped with a ram bow.

Propulsion
Propulsion was provided by a three-cylinder horizontal single-expansion steam engine by Maudslay, Sons & Field driving a single  screw.

Sail Plan
All the ships of the class were built with a barque rig.

Armament
The class was designed with two , 6½-ton muzzle-loading rifled guns mounted on slides on centre-line pivots, and two 64-pounder muzzle-loading rifled guns on broadside trucks. Dryad, Nymphe and Vestal were rearmed in the early 1870s with an armament of nine 64-pounder muzzle-loading rifled guns, four each side and a centre-line pivot mount at the bow.

History
She initially commenced service on the East Indies Station in 1867, before returning to England in 1871 for paying off. Nymphe was refitted, re-armed and placed in reserve. She started service on the Australia Station in March 1875. She left the Australia Station in August 1878, returned to England and was paid off in 1879.

Fate
She was sold from Chatham Dockyard in February 1885 to Castle and Sons, Vauxhall, Surrey for £3,745. She was taken to Vauxhall and broken up.

Citations

References
Bastock, John (1988), Ships on the Australia Station, Child & Associates Publishing Pty Ltd; Frenchs Forest, Australia. 

1866 ships
Ships built in Deptford
Amazon-class sloops
Victorian-era sloops of the United Kingdom